Tamati Andre Williams (born 19 January 1984) is a New Zealand footballer and fashion model. He last played as a goalkeeper for AaB in the Danish Superliga, and has represented New Zealand at the international level.

Playing career

Club
After unsuccessful trials with Blackburn Rovers and Stockport County in England at the age of 18, Williams began his club career with Football Kingz FC in their final season in the now-defunct National Soccer League. After a period with ASB Premiership side Waikato FC, Williams played one season for Auckland City in 2007 before temporarily retiring from football to work as a fashion model.

International
Williams represented New Zealand at the under-17, under-20, and under-23 Olympic levels. He made his debut as a full international against South Africa, when he replaced his colleague Glen Moss as a second-half substitute.

Modeling
As a fashion model, Williams has represented brands such as Calvin Klein and Esprit, and has worked in the United States, France, Italy, and Australia. In 2007, he was featured on an episode of America's Next Top Model, appearing in a beach photo with Cycle 8 winner Jaslene Gonzalez. He is represented by the agencies Red11 in Auckland, and Chic Management in Sydney.

Personal life
Williams was born in Dunedin, and lived for a period in his childhood in Whangārei. His father played rugby union for Otago. As of 2014, Williams was studying for a postgraduate diploma in zoology and conservation biology.

He is of Māori descent, and holds a Dutch passport through a grandparent.

Honours
Uni-Mount Wellington
Chatham Cup (1): 2003
Auckland City FC
ASB Premiership (1): 2014
OFC Champions League (4): 2012, 2013, 2014, 2015
FIFA Club World Cup bronze medal (1): 2014

See also
 New Zealand national football team
 New Zealand national football team results
 List of New Zealand international footballers

References

External links
 
 
 

1984 births
Living people
Association football goalkeepers
Auckland City FC players
RKC Waalwijk players
AaB Fodbold players
New Zealand Football Championship players
Eerste Divisie players
New Zealand association footballers
New Zealand international footballers
New Zealand Māori sportspeople
New Zealand people of Dutch descent
Association footballers from Dunedin
2004 OFC Nations Cup players
2016 OFC Nations Cup players
2017 FIFA Confederations Cup players